One Jump Ahead is a 1955 British crime film directed by Charles Saunders and starring Paul Carpenter, Diane Hart, Jill Adams and Freddie Mills. The film was based on a novel by American crime novelist Robert H. Chapman. The screenplay concerns a journalist who helps police track down the killer of a female blackmailer. The title refers to the reporter's attempts to keep "one jump ahead" of the police in solving the crime.

Plot
Reporter Paul Banner, a Canadian "noozeman", works at the Daily Comet in England. When a young boy witnesses a murder, the killer mistakenly tracks down the boy's friend and kills who he thinks is the only witness to the crime. Banner becomes interested in getting to the bottom of the murders but complications arise when Judy (Jill Adams), his ex-love, becomes involved.

Banner sets out to find the killer, and has the help of Maxine (Diane Hart), a reporter with whom he works at the paper; the two have also been involved in a relationship. Together, they ferret out who the mystery killer is, keeping "one jump ahead" of the police.

Cast

 Paul Carpenter as Paul Banner
 Diane Hart as Maxine
 Jill Adams as Judy
 Freddie Mills as Bert Tarrant
 Peter Sinclair as Old Tarrant
 Arnold Bell as Superintendent Faro
 David Hannaford as Brian
 Roddy Hughes as Mac
 Edward French as Jimmy Mumby
 June Ashley as Betty West
 Rose Howlett as Mrs. Mumby
 Mary Jones as Mrs. Snell
 Charles Lamb as Mr. Snell
 Arthur Gross as Arthur Walker

Production
Director Charles Saunders also made Behind the Headlines (1956), the second of three crime thrillers based on the works of American novelist Robert Chapman. In 1958, he also directed Murder Reported. All three films had many similarities; the stories all revolved around a news reporter investigating a murder, each lead role played by Paul Carpenter, with different supporting casts. Saunders specialized in the B movie at the Kenilworth Films Production house which turned out 11 mainly crime thrillers between 1948 and 1956.

Critical reception
TV Guide gave One Jump Ahead two out of five stars and wrote, "... occasionally witty dialog enhances this B-bracket programmer." In a recent review, SkyChannel TV noted, "Not at all bad for a British co-feature of its time, with some good crackles of humour in the dialogue and a lively tempo. Ex-boxing champion Freddie Mills appears in one of several roles he played in British films of the 50s."

References

Notes

Bibliography

 Chibnall, Steve and Brian McFarlane. The British 'B' Film. London: Palgrave MacMillan, 2009. .
 Goble, Alan. The Complete Index to Literary Sources in Film. London: Walter de Gruyter, 1999. .

External links
 

1955 films
1955 crime films
Films directed by Charles Saunders
British crime films
1950s English-language films
1950s British films
British black-and-white films